Lakamané is a rural commune and village in the Cercle of Diéma in the Kayes Region of western Mali. The commune contains 16 villages. In the 2009 census the commune had a population of 15,912.

References

Communes of Kayes Region